Ali Ouédraogo (born 31 December 1976) is a Burkinabé football player who, as of 2006, was playing for Etoile Filante Ouagadougou.

He was part of the Burkinabé 2002 African Nations Cup team, who finished bottom of group B in the first round of competition, thus failing to secure qualification for the quarter-finals.

External links

1976 births
Living people
Burkinabé footballers
Burkina Faso international footballers
Association football midfielders
2002 African Cup of Nations players
Étoile Filante de Ouagadougou players
21st-century Burkinabé people